Erste Bank Arena (also known as Albert Schultz Eishalle) is an indoor sporting arena located in Vienna, Austria. The arena has a capacity of 7,022 people and was opened in January 1995. It underwent major renovations in 2010 and 2011 to increase the capacity from 4,500 to over 7,000.

It has three rinks for hockey, figure skating, and public skating and is currently home to the Vienna Capitals ice hockey team. Slovakia's Colosseo EAS installed audio visual components into all three upgraded halls and can be used with various sports such as ice hockey, handball, volleyball, basketball or tennis.

See also
 List of indoor arenas in Austria

References

External links

 
 Information page from City of Vienna (in German)

Indoor ice hockey venues in Austria
Sports venues in Vienna
Vienna Capitals
Sports venues completed in 1995
1995 establishments in Austria
20th-century architecture in Austria